Lenzie RFC is a rugby union side based in Lenzie, East Dunbartonshire, Scotland. The club was founded in 1898. They play their home games at Viewfield.

History

The opening match of Lenzie RFC was reputed to be against the crew of HMS Benbow in 1898.

The club won the SRU's Scotland's team of the month competition in March 2019.

They won the Tennents West Division 2 in season 2018–19.

As well as a 1st and 2nd Men's XV, the club also run Junior sides for boys and girls and a Women's XV.

Notable former players

Glasgow Warriors

The following former Lenzie players went on to represent Glasgow Warriors.

Lenzie Sevens 

Lenzie play host to the Lenzie Sevens tournament. The tournament has run since 1969.

Honours

 Lenzie Sevens
 Champions: 1970, 1977, 1980, 1981, 1982, 1983, 1990, 1995
 St. Mungos Sevens
 Champions: 1980, 1983
 Dumfries Sevens
 Champions: 1981
 Lanarkshire Sevens
 Champions: 1977, 1979
 Helensburgh Sevens
 Champions: 1977, 1979, 1981
 Hillfoots Sevens
 Champions: 1989
 Stirling Sevens
 Champions: 1954, 1959
 West Division 2
 Champions: 2019

References 

Rugby union in East Dunbartonshire
Scottish rugby union teams
Lenzie